Dmitrovsky Uyezd (Дмитро́вский уе́зд) was one of the subdivisions of the Oryol Governorate of the Russian Empire. It was situated in the southern part of the governorate. Its administrative centre was Dmitrovsk.

Demographics
At the time of the Russian Empire Census of 1897, Dmitrovsky Uyezd had a population of 105,168. Of these, 99.8% spoke Russian and 0.1% Yiddish as their native language.

References

 
Uezds of Oryol Governorate
Oryol Governorate